The 11th Pan American Games were held in Havana, Cuba, from August 2 to August 18, 1991.  Bermuda participated in five sports but won no medals.

Results by events

Athletics
Brian Wellman
Troy Douglas
Donna Bean
Terry-Lynn Paynter
Anna Eatherley
Frederick Lottimore
Clarence Saunders
Michael Watson

Cycling
Elliot Hubbard
Clark Tear
Karl Outerbridge
Michael Lee
Vance Stevens
Kevin Tucker

Sailing
Malcolm Smith
Blythe Walker
Stephen Dickinson
Brett Wright
Wesley Tucker
Raymond DeSilva
Paula Lewin

Swimming
Jennifer Smatt
Stanley Harris
Christopher Flook
Michael Cash
Jason Krupp
Geri Mewett
Ian Raynor

Tennis
Stephen Alger
Michael Way
William Way, Jr.

See also
 Bermuda at the 1992 Summer Olympics

References
Bermuda Olympic Committee

Nations at the 1991 Pan American Games
Pan Amer
1991